Croceibacterium salegens is a Gram-negative, rod-shaped and slightly halophilic bacterium from the genus Croceibacterium which has been isolated from sediments from Mai Po.

References

External links
Type strain of Altererythrobacter salegens at BacDive -  the Bacterial Diversity Metadatabase

Sphingomonadales
Bacteria described in 2017